The Adding Machine is a 1969 British fantasy comedy drama film produced, written, and directed by Jerome Epstein and starring Milo O'Shea, Phyllis Diller, Billie Whitelaw, Sydney Chaplin, and Raymond Huntley. It is based on a stage production of the 1923 Elmer Rice play  The Adding Machine directed by Jerome Epstein in Los Angeles in the 1940s. It was shot at Shepperton Studios outside London. The film's sets were designed by the art director Jack Shampan. It was distributed in the United Kingdom by Universal Pictures.

Plot
An accountant whose job is about to be taken over by a comptometer (a primitive adding machine) starts to re-examine his life and his priorities.

Cast
 Milo O'Shea as Mr. Zero
 Phyllis Diller as Mrs. Zero
 Billie Whitelaw as Daisy Devore
 Sydney Chaplin as Lieutenant Charles
 Julian Glover as Shrdlu
 Raymond Huntley as Smithers
 Phil Brown as Don
 Paddie O'Neil as Mabel
 Libby Morris as Ethel
 Hugh McDermott as Harry
 Bill Nagy as Lawyer 
 Carol Cleveland as Judy 
 Bruce Boa as Detective

Reception
The film (and the play) received a critical 1969 review from Roger Greenspun.

See also
 List of American films of 1969

References

External links

1969 films
1960s fantasy comedy-drama films
1960s English-language films
British fantasy comedy-drama films
American fantasy comedy-drama films
British films based on plays
American films based on plays
Universal Pictures films
Films shot at Shepperton Studios
1960s American films
1960s British films